Peter Frederick (Charles) Anson (22 August 1889 – 10 July 1975) was an English non-fiction writer on religious matters and architectural and maritime subjects. He spent time as an Anglican Benedictine monk before converting to Catholicism.

Biography
Peter Anson was born Frederick Charles Anson in Southsea on 22 August 1889, the son of Charles Eustace Anson (1858–1940), later a rear-admiral (son of Frederick Anson, Canon of Windsor and Caroline Maria, daughter of George Venables-Vernon, 5th Baron Vernon), and his wife, (Maria) Evelyn, née Ross (1863–1904). His brother was the electrical engineer Horatio St George Anson. He was educated at Wixenford School until the age of almost 15. His father's family had a history of prominence in the Anglican Church.

Anson converted to Roman Catholicism on 5 March 1913. In doing so, he followed the example of the members of the Anglican Benedictine monastery on Caldey Island (Ynys Bŷr), Pembrokeshire, Wales, under Aelred Carlyle, of which he had been one since 1910. He was received into the Third Order of the Franciscans in 1922, adopting the name Peter.

Anson was the author of some 40 books, many of them on religious subjects, and one of them a biography of Aelred Carlyle, who founded the first regular Anglican Community of Benedictines. He was also an accomplished artist.

In 1936, Anson moved to the north-east of Scotland, his mother's country of origin, living at Macduff, Banffshire from 1937 to 1952, and becoming involved in the early activities of Scottish nationalism. His acquaintance there included Neil M. Gunn and Compton Mackenzie.

Selected bibliography

References

External links
General information on Peter Anson

1889 births
1975 deaths
English Roman Catholics
Converts to Roman Catholicism from Anglicanism
People educated at Wixenford School
English Anglicans
Anglican monks